Anthoxanthum aristatum is a species of grass known by the common names awned vernalgrass or annual vernalgrass. It is native to North Africa and southern and western Europe as far north as the Netherlands, and it is known in other regions, including northern Europe and North America, as an introduced species. It is occasionally a minor weed of fields. This is an annual grass growing in small tufts up to about 30 centimeters tall. The leaves are short, pointed, and somewhat hairy. The inflorescence is up to 3 centimeters long and one wide, flat and hairy with spikelets a few millimeters long.

References

Jepson Manual Treatment
USDA Plants Profile
Annual Vernalgrass in the UK

Pooideae
Flora of Africa
Flora of Europe
Plants described in 1839
Taxa named by Pierre Edmond Boissier